The 1973 Rothmans 5000 European Championship was a motor racing series for Formula 5000 cars. The series was organized in the United Kingdom by the British Racing and Sports Car Club but also incorporated European rounds. It was the fifth in an annual sequence of European Formula 5000 Championships, and the first to be contested as the Rothmans 5000 European Championship. The 1973 championship was won by Teddy Pilette, driving a McLaren M18 and a Chevron B24.

The championship was open to Formula 5000 cars, which were defined for this series as single-seater cars using production based engines. Significant changes to the technical regulations were made for 1973. Engines from 2750cc to 5000cc capacity were now permitted, regardless of the number of cylinders. Engines with a capacity of between 4000cc and 5000cc were still required to use pushrod operated valve gear, however engines of less than 4000cc capacity could use unrestricted valve gear and could be turbocharged.

Calendar
The championship was contested over fifteen rounds.

Points system
Championship points were awarded on a 20–15–12–10–8–6–4–3–2–1 basis for the first ten places at each of the first seventeen rounds and on a 40-30-24-20-16-12-8-6-4-2 basis for the first ten places at the final round.

Championship standings

References

European Formula 5000 Championship seasons
Rothmans